18 to Life is a Canadian sitcom television series that debuted on January 4, 2010, on CBC. The series is shown in Quebec on Vrak.TV with the title Majeurs et mariés.

Synopsis
The show stars Stacey Farber and Michael Seater as Jessie Hill and Tom Bellow, a young couple who decide, on a dare, to get married right out of high school. The cast also includes Peter Keleghan and Ellen David as Tom's parents Ben and Judith Bellow, and Alain Goulem and Angela Asher as Jessie's parents Phil Hill and Tara Mercer. The two families live next door to each other and ascribe to the adage that "good fences make good neighbors." Jessie's parents are free-spirited and do not believe in societal constructs of marriage or organized religion. They have a refugee from Iraq living in their basement. Tom's parents are traditional white-collar sticklers for rules. Tom's father is a judge who converted to Judaism when he married and his mother is a homemaker. Jessie and Tom eventually settle into the attic suite of Tom's parents' house as their first marital home and try to balance college, work, and the trials of being young newlyweds. The show is set in Montreal, Quebec.

Production
The series was originally announced in 2008 as a co-production between CBC and the American television network ABC, although ABC later dropped out of the production. The pilot was filmed in 2008 and the rest of the first season was filmed in the summer of 2009. The CW, another U.S. network, had interest in the series and announced on July 15, 2010 that it would pick up the show.

Season 2 was filmed in the summer of 2010 and returned to CBC on January 3, 2011, with 13 new episodes.

CBC has officially canceled the show and there will be no season three. The final episode, the 25th, was telecast on March 28, 2011.

Episodes

Season 1 (2010)

Season 2 (2011)

International distribution
18 to Life was broadcast in the United States on The CW. The first six episodes were shown in August 2010. On August 19, 2010, The CW announced that it had removed the series from its schedule. On August 24, 2010 it was reported that Arnie Gelbart, executive producer of the series and CEO of the production company Galafilm Productions, said The CW would show the remaining six episodes of the first season in December 2010; this never did occur.

In India, Zee Café began broadcasting the first season on February 9, 2011.

Reception

Critical reception
John Doyle of The Globe and Mail said that 18 to Life "crackles with wit" and that "Peter Keleghan is in fine fettle as Tom's uptight dad." Quebecor Media'''s Bill Harris called the premise "kind of refreshing" and described it as a "Canadian combination of Meet the Parents and Modern Family." Rob Owen of the Pittsburgh Post-Gazette described the series as a "gentle, intermittently entertaining Canadian import." He also compared 18 to Life to the sitcom Dharma & Greg. Roger Catlin of The Hartford Courant found 18 to Life to be "kind of sweet in a Disney/ABC Family kind of way."

Brad Oswald of the Winnipeg Free Press said there is "plenty of next-door comedy" however he found the premise "simply isn't believable". Glenn Garvin of The Miami Herald does not like the series. "The CW, a network aimed at teenage girls, apparently couldn't find an American network stupid or venal enough to make a sitcom about the amusing foibles of teen marriage. Thanks for stepping in, Canada. What would we do without you?" Megan Angelo of The Wall Street Journal leads off her review by mistakenly claiming this is "adapted from a Canadian hit" when there is no American adaptation of the show. She then mentioned the general critical decrying of the glamourisation of out-of-wedlock pregnancy in the films Juno and Knocked Up and then says that out-of-pregnancy wedlock is not any better for teenagers. Angelo goes on to say that "what makes it really hard to watch is Tom and Jessie's casual discourse on sex." She further explains that what makes 18 to Life so difficult to watch compared to shows such as Gossip Girl and 90210 is that creating a believable world and "trying to legitimize the whole thing only makes it worse – and usually, the CW doesn't try." Mary McNamara, television critic for Los Angeles Times, opens her review by saying, "The setup for this CW show isn't anything new. Except, possibly, in its old-fashioned commitment to marriage." McNamara later says "It is much more shocking to see these young people leap into matrimony than it would be if they were just having sex or even moving in together." As to the writing, McNamara says it "plays like an improv exercise in a high school drama class".

Jaime Weinman of Maclean's reviewed the negative American reviews, in particular those from the Los Angeles Times and The Wall Street Journal, and had concern about their "criticizing the show because it's about two over-18 teenagers who get married." In writing of The Wall Street Journal review Weinman said it is an "odd presumption" that "a relatively realistic portrayal of teenage sex, of somewhat normal and (comparatively) de-glamorized teens who have been sexually active, is worse than the glossy version we get on the CW's own shows." In response to McNamara's comment in Los Angeles Times about the marriage of the two main characters being shocking Weinman said, "That's part of the point of the show: the characters make a decision that has more impact, legally and culturally, than any other, and one that their parents fear will ruin their lives."

Ratings
The show premiered on January 4, 2010 on CBC. Only the weekly top 30 ratings are available to the public in Canada and 18 to Life never ranked in the top 30 during its first season.

The U.S. premiere on The CW on August 3, 2010 garnered 1.01 million viewers and a 0.4 rating with adults 18–49 and even lost viewers from an encore of the low rated summer reality series Plain Jane'' which preceded the premiere. The next two episodes aired on The CW on August 10 and fell in the ratings even further with only 0.76 million viewers and a 0.3 rating in the adults 18–49 demographic.

Home video
On January 18, 2011 the first season was released on DVD in both the US and Canada. The second season has not been released or announced on DVD, but both the first and second seasons are available for purchase from the Canadian iTunes Store in both HD and SD format, and were previously available on Netflix. It is currently available to stream on the media content platform Tubi TV.

Streaming
In July 2019 the series has been released on the Canada Media Fund Encore + YouTube channel. It is also streaming on Amazon.

References

External links
 

2010 Canadian television series debuts
2010s Canadian teen sitcoms
2011 Canadian television series endings
CBC Television original programming
English-language television shows
Television series about couples
Television series about families
Television series about teenagers
Television shows filmed in Montreal
Television shows set in Montreal
The CW original programming